Zhang Dong (born 18 November 1996) is a Chinese canoeist. He competed in the men's K-1 1000 metres event at the 2020 Summer Olympics.

References

External links
 

1996 births
Living people
Chinese male canoeists
Olympic canoeists of China
Canoeists at the 2020 Summer Olympics
Place of birth missing (living people)
Canoeists at the 2018 Asian Games
Medalists at the 2018 Asian Games
Asian Games medalists in canoeing
Asian Games gold medalists for China